Jeffrey W. Hutter is an American dentist and a former director of the American Board of Endodontics.

Biography
Hutter obtained a D.M.D. degree from the University of Pennsylvania and a certificate in endodontics from the Naval Dental School. He obtained a master's degree in education and human development from the George Washington University. He is a diplomat and former director of the American Board of Endodontics.

In 1996 he was retired from the United States Navy Dental Corps. Later he became a director of postdoctoral endodontics at the University of Maryland. He served on the scientific advisory board for the Journal of Endodontics. He was a reviewer of both Journal of the American Dental Association and the Journal of Evidence-based Dental Practice. He works at the Boston University Institute for Dental Research. He became the third dean of the Goldman School of Dental Medicine at the Boston University.

References

Living people
American dentists
University of Pennsylvania School of Dental Medicine alumni
George Washington University Graduate School of Education and Human Development alumni
Year of birth missing (living people)
Boston University faculty